The M19 Mortar is a light, smoothbore, muzzle-loading, high-angle-of-fire weapon for light infantry support developed and produced in the United States. It has been replaced in service by the more modern 60 mm M224 mortar, which has a much longer range and improved ammunition.

Description
The original M19 just had a simple spade-like M1 baseplate, leaving the elevation and traverse free for the firer.  This of course was found to be too inaccurate, and the infantry initially refused the M19.  A new mount, the M5, was developed, which used a conventional baseplate and bipod with elevation and traverse adjustment.  This gave the M19 better accuracy, but made it heavier than the M2 Mortar. It had the same range.

The M19 fired the same ammunition used in the M2 mortar, which it would replace. The 60 mm mortar is used by the infantry to lob high-explosive and white phosphorus smoke shells at well-protected hostile locations. The weapon can also fire illumination rounds to light up the battlefield at night. The primary difference between the M2 and M19 was that the M2 was drop-fire only while the M19 could be drop-fired or a round loaded and then fired by a lever-like trigger at the base of the tube.

History
M19 development began in 1942 as the T18E6 to replace the M2 Mortar.  It was a very simple and light weapon, but was too inaccurate without a mounting.  The conventional M5 mount for the M2 mortar was fitted to it.  It began to be fielded during the Korean War to replace the M2 and saw limited use in the Vietnam War.  Many M19s were scrapped or exported to other countries.

Users

  – produced under license
 
  – produced under license
 
 
 
 
  mostly SF used by Infantry on smaller islands too
 
  – Japan Ground Self-Defense Force used it.
 
 
 
 
 
 
 : The Armed Forces was equipped with 579 M2/M19s before the Korean War, and 2,263 were in service with the Army by the end of the war. Began replacing with KM19 in 1970s.

References

Notes

Bibliography
 Hogg, Ian (2000). Twentieth-Century Artillery. Friedman/Fairfax Publishers.

External links

Infantry mortars
Mortars of the United States
60mm mortars